1999 Elections to Fife Council were held on 6 May 1999, the same day as the other Scottish local government elections and the Scottish Parliament election. The election were the first after the third boundary review  which resulted in 78 individual councillors being elected.

Election results

Turnout was 56.1%

Party performance
Labour performed very well continuing control of its majority.

Changes since last election
Boundary Commission for Scotland had its Third review in to the ward area for Fife Area. The resulting changes lead to 14 fewer wards.

Ward results

References

External links

1999 Scottish local elections
1999
20th century in Fife
May 1999 events in the United Kingdom